The Red Thread is the fourth studio album by Scottish indie rock band Arab Strap, released on 26 February 2001 by Chemikal Underground.

Background
Aidan Moffat of Arab Strap has commented on the title of the album, saying:

Track listing

Charts

References

External links
 Official Arab Strap discography

Chemikal Underground albums
Arab Strap (band) albums
2001 albums